The Masurian Lake District or Masurian Lake Land is a lake district in northeastern Poland within the geographical region of Masuria, in the past inhabited by Masurians who spoke the Masurian dialect. It contains more than 2,000 lakes. The district had been elected as one of the 28 finalists of the New 7 Wonders of Nature.

Administratively, the Lake District lies within the Warmian-Masurian Voivodeship. Small parts of the district lie within the Masovian and Podlaskie Voivodeships.

The lakes are well connected by rivers and canals, forming an extensive system of waterways. The 18th-century Masurian Canal links this system to the Baltic Sea. The whole area is a prime tourist destination, frequented by boating enthusiasts, canoeists, anglers, hikers, bikers and nature-lovers. It is one of the most famous lake districts in Central Europe and a popular vacation spot, with the highest number of visitors every year.

Geology
The lake district was shaped by glaciers during the Pleistocene ice age. Many of its hills are parts of moraines and many of its lakes are moraine-dammed lakes.

History
From the 13th century on, the Lakeland was successively part of the monastic state of the Teutonic Knights, the Duchy of Prussia, and the Prussian province of East Prussia. In modern times, while part of the German Empire, it was the location of the First Battle of the Masurian Lakes (1914) and the Second Battle of the Masurian Lakes (1915) during World War I. At the end of World War II (1945), following the decision taken at the Potsdam Agreement, all national borders were redrawn, the area annexed by Communist Poland and its German residents expelled.

Historical population
Mother tongue of the inhabitants of Masuria, by county, during the first half of the 19th century:

Tourism

The Masurian Lakeland can be reached by train, bus or car. The nearest international airports are in Szymany, Warsaw, Gdańsk and Vilnius. The main transport hubs in the region are the towns of Olsztyn and Ełk. There are trains to Masuria from Warsaw, Gdańsk and Vilnius, and buses from many Polish cities. A boat service connects some central towns in the region. Biking and boating are popular ways to get around.

Hotels can be found in close proximity to the Great Masurian Lakes, in the towns of Giżycko, Mikołajki and Ełk among others. There are also guesthouses and campsites in surrounding villages. The Masuren Waterway starts in Węgorzewo in the north and finishes in Pisz. This Waterway is new for pleasure boats. Only boats with a low waterdraft can go as far as Pisz on the Pisa.

Sights and activities
Masuria is famous for its lakes and forests, offering a wide range of outdoor activities from sailing to kayaking and swimming. The region includes the largest lake in Poland, called Śniardwy. The resort towns include the most popular, Giżycko and Mikołajki, Węgorzewo, Ryn, Pisz and Iława. Giżycko is located on the shore of Lake Niegocin. It has an ancient fortress, historic church, bridges, and passenger boats to the towns of Węgorzewo, Mikołajki and Ruciane-Nida. The town of Mikołajki is a popular tourism center.

In addition to lakes, the Masurian region also has many rivers used for fly fishing, and forest areas that offer many trails for trekking and biking. There is also a variety of wildlife, edible berries and mushrooms, and large protected areas, including the Masurian Landscape Park that includes eleven nature reserves such as the Łuknajno Lake that is a UNESCO Biosphere Reserve, or the Białowieża Forest, with a breeding station for European Bison.

There are four separate boating trails set up along connecting lakes: from Giżycko to Węgorzewo and Ruciane-Nida, and from Mikołajki to Pisz and Ryn. There are also two kayaking trails along rivers, the most popular being the Krutynia River Trail. On top of that, there are several color-marked walking trails with numerous points of interest for qualified tourism. They include:
  The blue trail of K. I. Gałczyński,
  The yellow trail of K. Małłek,
  The green round trail (okrężny)
 Grand Trail of Mazury Garbate (Hunchbacked Mazury trail, to the north of the region)
  The blue trail of M. Kajek

Historical sights include the ruins of Hitler's fortified World War II headquarters, the Wolf's Lair, near Kętrzyn (former German name: Rastenburg), which has become a major tourist destination.

Climate
Masuria has a temperate climate with cold winters and warm summers. The weather here is generally a bit cooler than in most parts of Poland, and the area usually experiences several snowfalls during the winter. The Masurian lakes are oftentimes frozen from December until the end of February. Springtime can be wet, while summers are generally drier.

See also
 Geography of Poland
 Masuria
 Masurian dialect
 Tourism in Poland
 Warmia

References

External links
 Official website of the World Tourism Organization
 Tourist information, at mazury.info.pl 

Lakes of Warmian-Masurian Voivodeship
Lakes of Poland
Tourist attractions in Warmian-Masurian Voivodeship